Chantelle Fiddy is a British journalist, columnist, event promoter and music industry professional. She is well known as a commentator on London's grime scene and as a social activist as the former editor of Ctrl.Alt.Shift. She is currently contributing editor at RWD Magazine and urban editor at Mixmag. Her work has also appeared in i-D, Dazed & Confused, Sunday Times Style, The Guardian and The London Paper. She has also worked in television and radio. She was a featured presenter in Channel 4's 'Generation Next' series and has appeared as a guest on BBC Radio 1's Review Show. She also presented a 40-minute documentary on Lady Sovereign for BBC 1Xtra. Fiddy is one of the tastemakers who puts together the BBC's 'Sound of' List. In 2013 Fiddy starred in the BBC documentary series VIP People, with pop star A*M*E, and went behind-the-scenes on how to make a fanzine and how to become a successful recording artist. Fiddy is soon to feature in the latest Channel 4 style series by Ewen Spencer. 
After moving into music management in 2013, Fiddy has worked on the careers of Duke Dumont, Arkon Fly and Kelli-Leigh among others.

Career

Chantelle Fiddy's World of Grime
Fiddy's blog 'Chantelle Fiddy's World of Grime' has been a widely read source of news about the burgeoning grime scene since 2004. In 2005 it was featured in VIBE Magazine's top 10 music blogs. Fiddy also wrote for the scene's leading print magazines, including Touch, Deuce, Jockey Slut and Muzik. She has written artist biographies for Wiley, Giggs and Lady Sovereign.

679 Recordings
Fiddy spent two years at 679 Recordings working on strategy, setting up online channels and social networking sites for Kano and Plan B, A&Ring the 'Run The Road 2' compilation and organising remixes for The Streets. She also ran a series of successful club nights. Her work for record labels has continued as a consultant for Warner Bros. Records, Island Universal, Chrysalis, Atlantic and Ministry of Sound.

LIVE magazine
In 2007, Fiddy became managing editor at LIVE magazine. She mentored young people aged 13–21, providing journalism teaching and career guidance as well as helping the group achieve personal successes and goals.

Ctrl.Alt.Shift
In 2008, Fiddy became Editor of Ctrl.Alt.Shift, a new initiative on behalf of Christian Aid. Her role was to use popular culture to engage previously apathetic 18- to 25-year-olds in global issues such as international development. Ctrl.Alt.Shift produced a website and a magazine which became the first third sector publication to go on sale as a consumer title. She also worked on direct action events such as protests outside embassies and campaigns for women's rights. She worked with Riz Ahmed to create the 'United Underground' events at the Southbank Centre and organised a 'Rave for Haiti' with acts including Ms Dynamite, Tinie Tempah and Sway which raised over £10,000.

References

External links
Chantelle Fiddy's profile at The Guardian
Chantelle Fiddy’s Twitter page

Living people
20th-century British writers
21st-century British writers
British critics
Year of birth missing (living people)